Arjen Arî (1956 in Nusaybin, Turkey – 30 October 2012 in Amed/Diyarbakir) was a contemporary Kurdish poet and writer.

Biography
He was born in the village of Çalê in the Nusaybin District of Turkey. He graduated from the Turkish department of Diyarbakir College of Education in 1979. He was arrested for one week on charges of owning and distributing Kurdish and Turkish political pamphlets in 1976.

His writings have appeared in many Kurdish literary magazines including:  Tîrêj, Berbang, Nûdem, Çira, Pelîn,  and Rewşen. After being attacked by unidentified gunmen in 1992, he moved to Diyarbakir where he lived till his death.

He was one of the founders of the Kurdish Writers Association in 2004 and he served as its public relations officer.

Books
Ramûsan min veşartin li geliyekî, Poems, Avesta Publishers, 2000.
Ev çiya rûspî ne, Poems, Avesta Publishers, 2002.
Destana Kawa, Novel, Elma Publishers, 2003.
Eroûtîka, Poems, Lis Publishers, 2006.
Bakûrê Helbestê / Antolojiya Helbesta Bakûr (Anthology of Northern Kurdish Poetry), Union of Kurdish Writers of Duhok Publishers, 2008.
Şêrgele, Poems, Avesta Publishers, 2008.

References

Arjen Ari, Kurdish PEN (in Kurdish).
Interview with Arjen Ari, 2008 (in Kurdish).

Kurdish poets
Kurdish-language writers
1956 births
Date of birth missing
2012 deaths
20th-century poets